is a town located in Fukushima Prefecture, Japan. , the town had an estimated population of 10,416 in 3464 households, and a population density of 77 persons per km². The town is known locally for the "thousand cherry trees" which line the banks of the Natsui River. It is also one of the purported birthplaces of Heian period poet Ono no Komachi.

Geography
Ono is located in north-central Fukushima prefecture in the middle of Abukuma Highland, in eastern Nakadōri. It is surrounded by mountains over 700 meters above sea level. The Natsui River flows in the center of the town. Most of the town is within the borders of the Abukuma Kogen Chubu Prefectural Natural Park. 
Rivers: Natsui River

Neighboring municipalities
 Fukushima Prefecture
 Kōriyama
Tamura
 Iwaki
 Hirata

Climate
Ono has a humid continental climate (Köppen Cfa) characterized by mild summers and cold winters with heavy snowfall.  The average annual temperature in Ono is 10.7 °C. The average annual rainfall is 1390 mm with September as the wettest month. The temperatures are highest on average in August, at around 23.0 °C, and lowest in January, at around -0.5 °C.

Demographics
Per Japanese census data, the population of Ono has declined steadily over the past 60 years.

History
The area of present-day Ono was part of ancient Mutsu Province. After the Meiji Restoration it was organized as part of Nakadōri region of Iwaki Province. The villages of Iitoyo, Natsui, and Ononiimachi were established with the formation of the modern municipalities system on April 1, 1889. Ononiimachi was raised to town status on July 1, 1896. On February 1, 1955, it merged with Iitoyo and Natsui to form the town of Ono.

Economy
The economy of Ono is primarily mixed agricultural and light manufacturing.

Education
Ono has one public elementary schools and one public junior high school operated by the town government, and one public high school operated by the Fukushima Board of Education.

Transportation

Railway
JR East –  Ban'etsu East Line 
 –

Highway

Local attractions
Rika-chan Castle, a two-story museum, store and small-scale doll factory for the Licca-chan line of dolls.

References

External links

Official Website 

 
Towns in Fukushima Prefecture